The 2010 Aircel Chennai Open was a tennis tournament played on outdoor hard courts. It is the 15th edition of the Chennai Open, and part of the 250 series of the 2010 ATP World Tour. It takes place at the SDAT Tennis Stadium in Chennai, India, from 4 January through 10 January 2010. Second-seeded Marin Čilić won the singles title.

ATP entrants

Seeds

Other entrants
The following players received wildcards into the singles main draw:
  Rohan Bopanna
  Somdev Devvarman
  Carlos Moyá

The following players received entry from the qualifying draw:
  Prakash Amritraj
  Louk Sorensen
  James Ward
  Yang Tsung-hua

Finals

Singles

 Marin Čilić defeated  Stanislas Wawrinka, 7–6(7–2), 7–6(7–3).
It was Cilic's first title of the year, fourth overall, and his second consecutive title at the event.

Doubles

 Marcel Granollers /  Santiago Ventura defeated  Lu Yen-hsun /  Janko Tipsarević, 7–5, 6–2.

References

External links
 Official website

 
2010 ATP World Tour
2010
2010 in Indian tennis
January 2010 sports events in India